The 1950–51 Spartan League season was the 33rd in the history of Spartan League. The league consisted of 14 teams.

League table

The division featured 14 teams, 11 from last season and 3 new teams:
 Yiewsley
 Berkhamsted
 Hertford Town

References

1950–51
9